The 1952 Lehigh Engineers football team was an American football team that represented Lehigh University during the 1952 college football season. Lehigh tied for the Middle Three Conference championship.

In their third year under head coach William Leckonby, the Engineers compiled a 7–2 record. Bill Kitsos was the team captain.

Lehigh only played one of its Middle Three opponents, beating Lafayette; co-champion Rutgers also beat Lafayette but did not face Lehigh, giving them identical 1–0 conference records.

Lehigh played its home games at Taylor Stadium on the university's main campus in Bethlehem, Pennsylvania.

Schedule

References

Lehigh
Lehigh Mountain Hawks football seasons
Lehigh Engineers football